Nigel Roy is a former professional rugby league footballer who played as a  and in the s in the 1990s and 2000s.

He played for Illawarra, North Sydney, Northern Eagles and the London Broncos.

Early life
Roy was born 15 March 1974 in Lismore, New South Wales, Australia.

He commenced his football playing in the junior teams in Kyogle.

Playing career
Roy made his first grade debut for Illawarra in round 10 1993 against Cronulla-Sutherland at WIN Stadium which ended in a 30–0 victory.  Roy departed Illawarra at the end of 1994 and signed with North Sydney.

While at the North Sydney Bears, Roy played finals in 4 out of 5 seasons at the club and was a member of the Norths side which made consecutive preliminary finals in 1996 & 1997.  In 2000, North Sydney merged with arch rivals Manly-Warringah to form the Northern Eagles.  Roy was one of the few players from Norths signed on to play for the new team.  In 2001, Roy joined London and played with the club up until the end of 2004 before retiring.

References

External links
NRL points
London Broncos profile
Roy agrees new Broncos deal

1974 births
Living people
Australian rugby league players
Eastern Suburbs Tigers players
Illawarra Steelers players
Kyogle Turkeys players
London Broncos players
North Sydney Bears players
Northern Eagles players
Rugby league centres
Rugby league fullbacks
Rugby league players from Lismore, New South Wales
Rugby league wingers
Rugby articles needing expert attention